Aguanish is a municipality and village in the Côte-Nord region of the province of Quebec in Canada.

In addition to Aguanish itself, the municipality also includes the community of L'Île-Michon,  to the east along Route 138. Economic activity primarily centers on crab and salmon fishing.

The place is named after the Goynish or Aguanus River, that flows through and drains into the Gulf of Saint Lawrence right at the village. This word of Innu origin came from aguanus, in turn from akwanich, from the roots akwan (shelter) and ich (small). It has undergone many different spellings, including: Goines (17th century); Guanis, Goinis (1744 map by Bellin); Goynish (1776 map by Carver); Agwanus, Aguanus or Agouanus (maps of the 19th century).

History
For a few years in the 1830s, the Hudson's Bay Company operated the Nabisipi trading post at the mouth of the Nabisipi River (just west of the current town site).

The first European inhabitants, fishermen from the Magdalen Islands, settled in the area circa 1849. They were joined in 1875 by people from Kégashka (today Kegaska) and from Nabisipi River. The place was incorporated as a municipality in 1957.

Demographics

Population

Language

See also
 List of municipalities in Quebec

References 

Municipalities in Quebec
Incorporated places in Côte-Nord
Hudson's Bay Company trading posts